Deferribacter autotrophicus 	is an iron-reducing bacteria. It is thermophilic, anaerobic, 	chemolithoautotrophic, motile, straight to bent rod-shaped 	with one polar flagellum, 0.5–0.6 µm in width 	and 3.0–3.5 µm in length. The type strain is SL50T (=DSM 21529T 	=VKPM B-10097T).

References

External links 
	LPSN

	WORMS entry
Type strain of Deferribacter autotrophicus at BacDive -  the Bacterial Diversity Metadatabase

Deferribacterota
Bacteria described in 2009